Czech technical standard (ČSN) for technical, industrial and commercial standards, is a protected designation of Czech technical standards. Creation and issuance of ČSN is currently provided by the Czech office for Standards, Metrology and Testing.

ČSN was also the official name of the Czechoslovak state standards (since 1964), and after 1991 the Czechoslovak standards (Czechoslovak technical standards). The successor to ČSN in Slovakia is STN (Slovak Technical Standard).

See also
International Organization for Standardization

References

Economy of the Czech Republic